This is a list of Malaysian films produced and released in 2002. Most of the film are produced in the Malay language, but there also a significant number of films that are produced in English, Mandarin, Cantonese and Hokkien.

2002

January – March

April – June

July – September

October – December

Unreleased

See also
2002 in Malaysia

References

External links
Malaysian film at the Internet Movie Database
Malaysian Feature Films Finas
Cinema Online Malaysia

Malaysia
2002
2002 in Malaysia